Thorpe is a hamlet in the East Riding of Yorkshire, England.

It forms part of the civil parish of Lockington.

External links

Parish website

Villages in the East Riding of Yorkshire